Nicholas Rodrigues (born 9 September, 1982) is an Indian footballer who currently plays for Mumbai F.C. in the I-League. He most notably won the NFL Player of the Year award in 2005–06.

References

1989 births
Living people
Indian footballers
I-League players
Sporting Clube de Goa players
Salgaocar FC players
Churchill Brothers FC Goa players
Mumbai FC players
Footballers from Goa
Association football midfielders